The National Socialist Party was a small political party in the United Kingdom, founded in 1916. It originated as a minority group within the British Socialist Party who supported British participation in World War I; while historically linked with the Marxist left, the party broke with internationalism. It affiliated to the Labour Party and was eventually absorbed by it.

Origins
The National Socialist Party was founded by H.M. Hyndman and his followers after his defeat in the leadership elections of the British Socialist Party. They believed that it was desirable to support the United Kingdom in World War I against "Prussian militarism". Although maintaining that they were a Marxist party, after affiliation to the Labour Party in 1918, they renounced vanguardism and saw in the Russian Revolution only the danger that it might weaken the United Kingdom's war effort. The party was grouped around the newspaper Justice.

Three members of the party were elected to Parliament in the 1918 election; Dan Irving and Will Thorne were elected for the Labour Party, and Jack Jones under the National Socialist Party name.

Social Democratic Federation
In 1919, the group changed its name to the Social Democratic Federation, reverting to the name that the British Socialist Party had used. At one point eleven MPs were members, but after Hyndman died in 1921, the group gradually dissolved into the Labour Party. The party sponsored several candidates at each election until 1924, all of whom ran for Labour. After 1924, its MPs were instead sponsored by their local Labour Party. The party finally disbanded in 1939 due to a lack of funds, although some remaining members formed a "Social Democratic Fellowship".

Other prominent members included Henry W. Lee, Hunter Watts, John Stokes and Joseph Burgess.

Election results

1918 UK general election

By-elections, 1918-1922

1922 UK general election

1923 UK general election

1924 UK general election

References

Defunct social democratic parties in the United Kingdom
Political parties established in 1916
Political parties disestablished in 1941
Organisations associated with the Labour Party (UK)
History of the Labour Party (UK)
1916 establishments in the United Kingdom